Pinkie's Corner in Chase County, Nebraska was listed on the National Register of Historic Places in 2011. It is an example of an early rural auto roadside business. 

It was the 1920s–30s business site of handyman and inventor C. Roy Elvis "Pinkie" Hedges.

Pinkie became known as a "Supreme Do-It-Yourselfer", including in generating and using electricity before rural electrification became general.  The site is a monument to resourcefulness during the hard times of the Great Depression.

References

External links 
More photos of Pinkie's Corner at Wikimedia Commons

Commercial buildings on the National Register of Historic Places in Nebraska

Buildings and structures in Chase County, Nebraska